Xanthoconium is a genus of bolete fungi in the family Boletaceae. It was circumscribed by mycologist Rolf Singer in 1944, who included Boletus affinis and what was then known as Gyroporus stramineus as the type species. These two species were part of the "strange group of species described by Murrill and Snell as white-spored Gyropori, and separated by the latter under the new generic name Leucogyroporus." C.B. Wolfe described three species from the United States in 1987: X. chattoogaense, Xanthoconium montaltoense, and X. montanum. , the nomenclatural database Index Fungorum  list seven species in Xanthoconium.

The concept of Xanthoconium has been not fully described using molecular phylogenetic analysis, but it is clearly a distinct genus, apart from Boletus. However, Xanthoconium separans was found to be more closely related to Boletus Sensu stricto than to Xanthoconium.

Species
Xanthoconium affine (Peck) Singer (1944)
Xanthoconium chattoogaense Wolfe (1987)
Known only from the type locality, along a tributary of the Chattooga River in North Carolina.
Xanthoconium montaltoense Wolfe (1987)
Found in south-central Pennsylvania.
Xanthoconium montanum Wolfe (1987)
Found in Macon County, North Carolina, in Nantahala National Forest.
Xanthoconium purpureum Snell & E.A.Dick (1962)
Xanthoconium stramineum (Murrill) Singer (1944)

References

Boletaceae
Boletales genera
Taxa named by Rolf Singer